Erich Ziegel (26 August 1876 – 30 November 1950) was a German theatre director and actor. He appeared in more than forty films from 1920 to 1950. He was the founder of the Hamburg Kammerspiele.

Selected filmography

References

External links 

1876 births
1950 deaths
German male film actors
German male silent film actors
20th-century German male actors
German theatre directors